Manchester Roller Derby (MRD) is a flat track roller derby league based in Manchester, England. Founded in 2010, as the first co-ed league in the UK, they became members of the Men's Roller Derby Association in December 2012 and of United Kingdom Roller Derby Association in November 2013.

History 
Initially formed in 2010, MRD attracted attention in early 2011 when the league's original women's team played Hot Wheel Roller Derby at the Manchester Academy in a sell-out bout.

In November 2012, MRD hosted a bout as part of the New York Shock Exchange's 'Shock the UK' tour, which saw New Wheeled Order bout against the New York team. This was the first intercontinental men's flat track derby game.

The league formed a co-ed team known as the MRD Allstars to participate in the UK's first co-ed roller derby tournament in January 2013. MRD Allstars won this tournament against competition from Birmingham's Wheels of Mass Destruction, Nottingham Roller Derby and Sheffield Roller Derby.

As of March 2020, New Wheeled Order are ranked 7th in the MRDA.

League Structure 
The league consists of four teams:

 CheckerBroads (A, WFTDA-aligned, formed October 2010)
 New Wheeled Order (A, MRDA-aligned, formed December 2011)
 Furies (B, WFTDA-aligned, formed 2012)
 Chaos Engine (B, MRDA-aligned, formed 2013)

The league has a skater induction program, called Zero 2 Hero, to teach the skills needed for playing roller derby.

Affiliation 
In December 2012, MRD was accepted as one of the first three non-American members of the Men's Roller Derby Association. The league became a member of the United Kingdom Roller Derby Association in November 2013. MRD league members have expressed interest in being affiliated with the Women's Flat Track Derby Association, but the league does not meet the WFTDA membership requirements due to it being a co-ed league consisting of both women and men.

External links 
 Manchester Roller Derby's official website
 Manchester Roller Derby on Facebook
 Manchester Roller Derby on Twitter
 Manchester Roller Derby on YouTube

References

Roller derby in England
Roller derby leagues in the United Kingdom
Roller derby leagues established in 2010
Sport in Manchester
Men's roller derby
Women's sports leagues in England
Men's sport in England
2010 establishments in England